Dixon Bladimir Arroyo Valdez (born 12 August 1997) is an Ecuadorian weightlifter. He won the gold medal in men's +109kg event at the 2022 South American Games held in Asunción, Paraguay. He is also a two-time gold medalist at the 2022 Bolivarian Games held in Valledupar, Colombia.

In 2019, he competed in the men's 109kg event at the Pan American Games held in Lima, Peru. In 2021, he competed in the men's +109kg event at the World Weightlifting Championships held in Tashkent, Uzbekistan.

Achievements

References

External links 
 

Living people
1997 births
Place of birth missing (living people)
Ecuadorian male weightlifters
Weightlifters at the 2019 Pan American Games
Pan American Games competitors for Ecuador
South American Games gold medalists for Ecuador
South American Games medalists in weightlifting
Competitors at the 2022 South American Games
21st-century Ecuadorian people